Leo of Ohrid (died 1056) was a leading 11th-century Byzantine churchman as Archbishop of Ohrid (1037–1056) and advocate of the Ecumenical Patriarchate of Constantinople's views in the theological disputes with the See of Rome, which culminated in the East–West Schism of 1054.

Life 
Nothing is known about Leo's early life. Sometime after 1037, he was appointed Archbishop of Ohrid, prior to which he had held the position of chartophylax in the Hagia Sophia in Constantinople.

Under Patriarch Michael Keroularios (1043–59), Leo was sent as the spokesman of Constantinople to theological debates with clergymen representing the Pope of Rome in southern Italy. He reiterated his views in a 1053 letter to the bishop John of Trani, which was however addressed to the Pope and all Latin bishops. In this letter, "Leo for the first time shifted the religious estrangement between East and West toward liturgical and disciplinary issues" (J. Meyendorff), and condemned various practices of the Western Church such as the eating of strangled meat, with blood, the fasting on Saturdays (contrary to the Council of Trullo), or various minor issues of ritual. The most important point of friction, however, was the Western use of unleavened bread (azyma) for celebrating the Eucharist, which provoked a running argument carried out in a series of letters with Cardinal Humbert of Silva Candida, which finally led to Humbert's mission to Constantinople in 1054 and the finalizing of the Great Schism between Rome and the East through their mutual anathemas, resulting in the existence as separate Churches of the Roman Catholic Church and the Eastern Orthodox Church.

See also 
 History of the East–West Schism

References

Sources 
 

Year of birth unknown
1056 deaths
11th-century Byzantine bishops
Archbishops of Ohrid
Byzantine theologians
11th-century Byzantine writers
11th-century Christian theologians